Rodney Chad Smith (born June 8, 1995) is an American professional baseball pitcher for the Oakland Athletics of Major League Baseball (MLB). He made his MLB debut in 2022 with the Colorado Rockies.

Career
Smith graduated from McAdory High School in McCalla, Alabama. He enrolled at Wallace State Community College, where he played college baseball for two years. The Cleveland Indians selected him in the 23rd round of the 2015 MLB draft. He did not sign with Cleveland, and transferred to the University of Mississippi, where he played college baseball for the Ole Miss Rebels.

Miami Marlins 
The Miami Marlins selected Smith in the 11th round of the 2016 MLB draft, and Smith signed with the Marlins.

Colorado Rockies 
On August 13, 2020, the Marlins traded Smith to the Colorado Rockies for Jesús Tinoco. The Rockies promoted Smith to the major leagues on May 28, 2022. He made his major league debut on May 29.

Oakland Athletics 
On December 6, 2022, the Rockies traded Smith to the Oakland Athletics for minor-league pitcher Jeff Criswell.

Personal life
His grandfather, Norm Zauchin, played in MLB in the 1950s.

References

External links

1995 births
Living people
People from McCalla, Alabama
Baseball players from Alabama
Major League Baseball pitchers
Colorado Rockies players
Wallace State Lions baseball players
Ole Miss Rebels baseball players
Gulf Coast Marlins players
Batavia Muckdogs players
Greensboro Grasshoppers players
Jupiter Hammerheads players
Salt River Rafters players
Jacksonville Jumbo Shrimp players
Albuquerque Isotopes players